Tomris, Tomiris or Tamiris is a Turkic female name used in Azerbaijan, Turkey, Turkmenistan, Uzbekistan, and Kazakhstan. The name is a modern Turkic derivation of Tomyris (Eastern Iranian: تهم‌رییش Tahm-Rayiš), an ancient Iranian Massagetae queen from Central Asia.

People 
 :tr:Tomris Giritlioğlu, a Turkish film director.
 :tr:Tomris İncer, a Turkish actress.
 :tr:Tomris Uyar, a Turkish writer and translator.
 :tr:Tomris Oğuzalp, a Turkish actress.
 :tr:Tomris Çetinel, a Turkish actress.

See also
 Tomyris

References 

Turkish feminine given names